Ardabur is the name of:

 Ardabur (consul 427), Roman-Alanic general and politician
 Aspar (Flavius Ardabur Aspar, c.400–471), his son, general and politician
 Ardabur (consul 447) (died 471), his son, also a general and politician